S. M. W. Fernando was the 44th Surveyor General of Sri Lanka. He was appointed in 2009, succeeding B. J. P. Mendis, and held the office until 2013. He was succeeded by Kanagaratnam Thavalingam.

References

F